The Harry Evans Covered Bridge is a single span Burr Arch Truss structure that crosses Rock Run built in 1908 by J.A. Britton  north of Coxville, Indiana USA.

History
The story goes that one of the former neighbors of the bridge was incensed over naming the bridge after a local resident, Harry Evans. He claimed that because Harry lived at the top of the hill that it was named after another Evans who lived in the valley. However, county records show that Harry Evans owned the land near the bridge. The land stayed in the Evans name until the 1960s.

It was added to the National Register of Historic Places in 1978. The hills near the bridge are riddled with numerous, and dangerous, old coal mines.

Gallery

See also
 List of Registered Historic Places in Indiana
 Parke County Covered Bridges
 Parke County Covered Bridge Festival

References

External links
Parke County Covered Bridge Festival

Covered bridges on the National Register of Historic Places in Parke County, Indiana
Bridges completed in 1908
Historic district contributing properties in Indiana
1908 establishments in Indiana
Wooden bridges in Indiana
Burr Truss bridges in the United States